Rózsavölgyi is a surname. Notable people with the surname include:
 
István Rózsavölgyi (1929–2012), Hungarian athlete 
Márk Rózsavölgyi (1789–1848), Hungarian composer
 

Hungarian-language surnames